Horacio Zeballos was the defender of championship title, however he chose to participate  at Houston.João Souza won in the final 4–6, 6–4, 6–1 against Alejandro Falla.

Seeds

Draw

Finals

Top half

Bottom half

External links
 Main Draw Singles
 Qualifying Draw

Bancolombia Open - Singles
Bancolombia Open